Diiodobutadiyne (1,4-diiodobuta-1,3-diyne) is a small molecule related to diacetylene. It is used in the creation of the polymer poly(diiododiacetylene) (PIDA) by undergoing 1,4 polymerization.

1,4-Diiodobuta-1,3-diyne is light sensitive and explosive if stored out of solution as a dry solid. It will undergo random 1,2 and 1,4 polymerization, as well as decomposition in solution if kept over an extended period of time, having a half life of just about two weeks.

References

Conjugated diynes
Organoiodides